Saint-Barnabé-Sud is a municipality in southwestern Quebec in the Regional County Municipality of Les Maskoutains. The population as of the 2021 Canadian Census was 962. It is the birthplace of historian Jean-Baptiste-Arthur Allaire.

Demographics

Population

Language

Communities
Saint-Barnabé-Sud

Death of infant, 2010
On June 7, 2010, police reported that a 20-day-old infant in Saint-Barnabé-Sud had been killed by a dog, a Siberian Husky, that afternoon.

See also
List of municipalities in Quebec

References

Répertoire des municipalités du Québec
Affaires municipales et régions - cartes régionales

Municipalities in Quebec
Incorporated places in Les Maskoutains Regional County Municipality